was a Japanese samurai and  lord of Kurokawa Castle (Aizu Castle) in the early Sengoku period. He was the lord of the Ashina (Sawara) family.

He was adopted by Ashina Morioki to continue the family line, and as per that arrangement, married Morioki's daughter and had a son, Kiōmaru. After Moritaka's succession, he, became very unpopular among his retainers. Ashina Morishige would become Moritaka's successor because his own son, Kiōmaru, had died at the age of 2.

Notes

References
Short biography (near bottom of page) on Ashina

1561 births
1584 deaths
Samurai
Daimyo
Ashina clan
Assassinated Japanese people